Raymond Flacher (24 October 1903 – 4 September 1969) was a French fencer. He won a silver medal in the team foil event at the 1928 Summer Olympics.

References

External links
 

1903 births
1969 deaths
Fencers from Paris
French male foil fencers
Olympic fencers of France
Fencers at the 1928 Summer Olympics
Olympic silver medalists for France
Olympic medalists in fencing
Medalists at the 1928 Summer Olympics
20th-century French people